Patrick Kinigamazi (born 2 March 1983) is a Rwandan former professional boxer who competed from 2006 to 2020. He held the African lightweight title in 2016 and the WBF super featherweight title from 2017 to 2020.

Early life
Kinigamazi was born on 2 March 1983 in Gisenyi, Rwanda, and moved to Switzerland in at the age of fifteen to join family in the aftermath of the Rwandan genocide. After beginning in combat sports when he was seventeen, he followed his brother into a boxing ring and joined Club pugilistique de Carouge (CP Carouge).

During his early years as a pro boxer he also competed in kickboxing, winning two World and four European titles. On 2 May 2010, he won the WKN full-contact world featherweight title from Gary Hamilton, ending his seven-year reign as champion. Kinigamazi later called it his toughest fight.

Kinigamazi also played basketball with Bernex Geneve Basket.

Professional career
Kinigamazi made his professional boxing debut on 29 June 2006, defeating Rocco Cipriano by fifth-round technical knockout in Carouge. He won his first title in his seventh fight, a split decision victory over Martino Ciano for the vacant Swiss lightweight title. After a streak of 16 wins to start his pro career he lost his first bout in 2011 to future European super featherweight champion Guillaume Frenois. A year later he suffered his second defeat at the hands of another Frenchman, Sebastien Cornu.

On 18 November 2016, more than nine years after his last championship fight, he beat Spanish-based Congolese fighter Clark Telamanou for the vacant African lightweight title via majority decision with the scorecards reading 96–94, 96–94 and 95–95. Two fights later, on 9 June 2017, a 34-year-old Kinigamazi defeated Juan José Farias unanimously (117–106, 116–107, 116–107) to win vacant WBF super featherweight title. He had four successful defenses against young contenders before he faced veteran South African Bongani Mahlangu in Geneva in his fifth defense, defeating the 2004 Olympian by majority decision on 12 December 2019. He was also named 2017 Fighter of the Year at the WBF Awards.

Kinigamazi was scheduled to fight Michael Magnesi on 6 November 2020 for the vacant IBO super featherweight title, but it had to be postponed after he tested positive for COVID-19. Three weeks later, Kinigamazi was stopped for the first time in his career. Magnesi knocked him down in the third round and again in the fifth to seal the victory. Kinigamazi confirmed that this was his last fight.

Kinigamazi had previously served as a promoter during his career, and continued in the role after his retirement. On 24 June 2021, he organized an event at the Salle Palladium in Geneva which featured the pro debut of Bryan Fanga, a Swiss prospect of Cameroonian origin who was seen by many as Kinigamazi's successor. It featured both pro and amateur bouts and was the first boxing event held in Switzerland in over a year and a half due to the COVID-19 pandemic.

Professional boxing record

References

External links
 

Living people
1983 births
Rwandan male boxers
Super-featherweight boxers
Lightweight boxers
African Boxing Union champions
Boxing promoters
Rwandan male kickboxers
Featherweight kickboxers
Rwandan emigrants to Switzerland
People from Gisenyi
Sportspeople from the canton of Geneva